Paulo Guilherme Gonçalves Bernardo (born 24 January 2002) is a Portuguese professional footballer who plays as a midfielder for Primeira Liga club Paços de Ferreira on loan from Benfica.

Club career
A product of S.L. Benfica's youth system, Bernardo played for its ranks and signed his first professional contract with Benfica on 26 February 2018. He made his debut for Benfica's reserve team in a Segunda Liga match against Vilafranquense on 2 February 2020, with manager Renato Paiva praising him as one of the "future stars of the club".

After a promising 2020–21 season with the B team, Bernardo started the 2021–22 season, with various solid performances, leading him to be named Liga Portugal 2's Midfielder of the Month for the months of October and November. On 2 November 2021, Bernardo made his first-team debut coming on the 77th minute in a 5-2 Champions League group stage defeat at Bayern Munich. Later that week, on 7 November 2021, he made his Primeira Liga debut coming on for injured João Mário on the 23rd minute for a 6–1 home win against Braga.

On 31 January 2023, Bernardo was loaned by Paços de Ferreira until the end of the season.

International career
With the Portugal under-17s, Bernardo took participated in the 2019 UEFA European Under-17 Championship in Ireland, playing four matches, scoring one goal as the team lost in the quarter-finals to Italy.

On 6 September 2021, Bernardo won his first cap for the under-21 side, replacing André Almeida in the 73rd minute in a 1–0 victory against Belarus for the 2023 European Championship qualification campaign.

Career statistics

Club

Notes

Honours
Benfica
Taça da Liga runner-up: 2021–22
Individual
 Liga Portugal 2 Midfielder of the Month: October/November 2021

References

2002 births
Living people
Sportspeople from Almada
Portuguese footballers
Portugal youth international footballers
Portugal under-21 international footballers
Association football midfielders
Liga Portugal 2 players
Primeira Liga players
S.L. Benfica B players
S.L. Benfica footballers
F.C. Paços de Ferreira players